Navodaya may refer to

 Navodaya, a modern literature movement in the Kannada language
Navodaya Appachan (1925–2012), Indian film producer, director, and entrepreneur
Navodaya Institute of Technology, a college in Raichur, India
Navodaya Medical College, a medical college in Raichur, India
Navodaya Studio in the Malayalam language film industry of India
Navodaya Times, a Hindi-language newspaper established in 2013 and published in Delhi
Saju Navodaya, Indian film actor

See also